The Grasshopper and the Ant is a 1913 Russian short animated film directed and written by Ladislas Starevich.

Plot 
The film is based on a fable by I. Krylov.

References

External links 
 

1913 films
1913 short films
1910s Russian-language films
Russian silent short films
Russian black-and-white films
1913 animated films
Films of the Russian Empire
1910s animated short films
Russian animated short films